The Piano Concerto No. 4 in D minor, Op. 70, by Anton Rubinstein is a  Romantic concerto that was once highly esteemed and was in the repertoire of the Russian and Polish piano virtuosos Sergei Rachmaninoff and Ignacy Jan Paderewski.

Anton Rubinstein, himself a renowned pianist, left five numbered piano concertos. (He wrote three earlier piano concertos; two were lost and the third was transformed into Octet, Op. 9.) Rubinstein composed the Fourth Concerto in 1864. He published two revisions of it and then a final revision in 1872. He dedicated the concerto to the violinist Ferdinand David.

Movements

The concerto is in three movements:

 Moderato assai
 Andante
 Allegro

Selected discography

Josef Hofmann's reading of this concerto is generally considered as a definitive rendition.
 Xaver Scharwenka's Piano Concerto No. 1 in B-flat minor and Anton Rubinstein's Piano Concerto No. 4 in D minor performed by Marc-André Hamelin with the BBC Scottish Symphony Orchestra conducted by Michael Stern (Hyperion 67508)
 Sergei Rachmaninoff's Piano Concerto No. 3 and Anton Rubinstein's Piano Concerto No. 4 in D minor performed by Joseph Moog with the Deutsche Staatsphilharmonie Rheinland-Pfalz conducted by Nicholas Milton (Onyx 4089)

References
Notes

Sources

External links

Piano concerto 4
1864 compositions
Compositions in D minor